Viktoryia Andreyeuna Rashchupkina (born 23 May 1995) is a Belarusian racewalking athlete. She qualified to represent Belarus at the 2020 Summer Olympics in Tokyo 2021, competing in women's 20 kilometres walk.

References

1995 births
Living people
Sportspeople from Brest, Belarus
Belarusian female racewalkers
Athletes (track and field) at the 2020 Summer Olympics
Olympic athletes of Belarus